Kandor (commonly known as the Bottle City of Kandor) is a fictional city spared from the doomed world of Krypton in DC Comics' Superman titles. Before Krypton exploded, the futuristic city was captured by the supervillain Brainiac, miniaturized by his shrinking ray and placed inside a glass bell jar. Defeating Brainiac and taking possession of the jar, Superman brings the city to his Arctic hideout, the Fortress of Solitude, and spends many years attempting to restore it to normal size.

Publication history
The city first appeared in the story "The Super-Duel in Space", published in Action Comics #242 (July 1958), written by Otto Binder and drawn by Al Plastino during the period known as the Silver Age of Comic Books. This was part of editor Mort Weisinger's desire to build a wider canvas of supporting characters and locations for the various Superman titles, creating more opportunities for new stories to emerge. The miniature city allowed writers to explore Kryptonian culture, which had previously been just an offscreen preface to the series. The concept was explored in depth over the next ten years, as the readers became fascinated with the bottled city and its glimpses of Kryptonian life.

The conceit helped to humanize the god-like Superman, and enrich his characterization. In Superman: The Complete History, Les Daniels observed that "showing Superman so much at home in the bottle emphasized the extent to which he was as much an alien as an American". In Superman: The High-Flying History of America's Most Enduring Hero, Larry Tye said that Kandor "made clear that even Superman couldn't get everything he wanted, since there was nothing he wanted more than to restore the Kandorians to their rightful size".

In their book Supergods, writer Grant Morrison explained the unique symbolism that the Bottle City represents:

The first Brainiac/Kandor comic book story in Action Comics #242 (July 1958) was based on a story arc in the Superman comic strip from April through August 1958. In the comic strip story, Superman's foe was named Romado, who traveled the cosmos with his pet white monkey Koko, shrinking major cities and keeping them in glass jars. The strip's Kryptonian bottled city was named Dur-El-Va. This cross-continuity conflict was not unprecedented; in 1958 and '59, editor Mort Weisinger used the comic strip to prototype a number of concepts that he planned to introduce in the book, including Bizarro and red Kryptonite.

Following Kandor's introduction in the comic books, the Bottle City inspired a number of plots involving both regular characters entering the jar to visit Kandor, as well as Kandorians leaving the jar to interact with the human world. Superman became a regular visitor, even creating a new Kandorian identity in 1963 as the superhero Nightwing, with Jimmy Olsen as his sidekick Flamebird.

While Binder and Plastino created the first Kandor story, the tale was elaborated on in a series of stories by writer Edmond Hamilton and artist Curt Swan. Swan particularly enjoyed drawing Kandor stories: "Where else could you have the fun of creating an entire city in a bottle? I think Al Plastino had first drawn Kandor, the Kryptonian city that had been miniaturized... But I had a lot of fun inventing all that tiny futuristic architecture, not to mention the view from inside the bottle — with the "giant" figures peering in". Swan also added: "Creating and re-creating the city was so much fun, in fact, that there was never a standard pattern or skyline of Kandor; it was never drawn the same way twice".

The people of Kandor were finally restored to normal size, to settle on a new planet that they called Rokyn ("God's Gift", from the name of the Kryptonian god Rao). This event was mentioned parenthetically in a 1965 story, "The Five Legion Orphans!" (Adventure Comics #356, May 1965), a prediction that finally came true almost fifteen years later, in "Let My People Grow!" (Superman #338, August 1979). In the latter story, Superman uses an enlarging ray to bring the city back; while the buildings prove unstable and crumble to dust, the restored citizens are happily relocated to their new home.

Len Wein, writer of this final Kandor story, said in a 2006 interview that he regretted restoring the city to normal size: "Although I like the ending of the story, I'm sorry I did the story. I don't think that any of us realized at the time that what was old to us was new to somebody just coming in... I came at Kandor thinking: 'I'm so tired of this. It's been 20 years, 30 years, of that stupid city'. So I came up with a story I thought might have some emotional impact... I regret that, because the idea of a bottle city of tiny people is a much cooler idea than what I left it as".

Fictional history

Silver Age
The first Kandor story, "The Super-Duel in Space", establishes that Kandor — Krypton's capital city — had been stolen years before the planet exploded. Superman has no powers when he's inside the jar, because "Krypton's gravity-conditions are duplicated" in the bottle. Kandorians, focused on scientific progress, build robots, rockets and an artificial sun. Superman meets a Kandorian scientist named Kimda who tells him that Brainiac's Hyper-Ray can reverse the miniaturization process. Superman liberates all of Brainiac's bottled cities, except for Kandor, because the Hyper-Ray runs out of cosmic-power. He brings it to the Fortress of Solitude, with a resolution to "restore it to normal size... someday! Who knows?"

In 1960, Otto Binder and Curt Swan introduced the Superman Emergency Squad, a group of volunteer Kandorians who happen to look just like Superman, and occasionally leave the jar to assist him in times of trouble like the story "The Mystery of the Tiny Supermen!" They use a special scientific process to enlarge themselves to the size of dolls, and when they leave the jar, they gain Superman-like powers. In a crisis, the swarm heads out to assist.

Post-Crisis
When the DC Universe continuity was rebooted in the 1985-86 miniseries Crisis on Infinite Earths, Kandor's history was changed. In this version of the story, Kandor was destroyed a thousand years before Krypton's end, blown up with an atomic device by the terrorist organization Black Zero.

A new version of Kandor was introduced in 1996, this one populated with a collection of various alien species, held in a prison that looked like a bottle but was actually an extra-dimensional space, created by the alien wizard Tolos.

Superman's history was shaken up again with the 2003-2004 miniseries Superman: Birthright, which replaced the post-Crisis status quo with a new version of Superman's early years. In this continuity, the city was stolen and shrunk by Brainiac.

The storylines and relaunches Infinite Crisis (2005-2006), Superman: New Krypton (2009-2009) (2008-2009), The New 52 (2011) and DC Rebirth (2016) have resulted in a number of different versions of Kandor, with varying degrees of resemblance to the original Silver Age creation. In the New Krypton world, the city is enlarged but its people come into conflict with Earth and suffer heavy casualties thanks to the machinations of Lex Luthor. In The New 52 they are manipulated into seeing Superman as their captor rather than their savior for failing to enlarge them.

Known inhabitants
The inhabitants of Kandor have varied in different continuities:

Earth-One's Kandor inhabitants
 Ak-Var - A former Phantom Zone inhabitant who now operates as Flamebird.
 Dev-Re - A science councillor who was part of the earlier establishment of Kandor. He has since become a friend of Superman.
 Dik-Zee - The twin brother of Van-Zee and first cousin once removed of Superman and Supergirl who once fell in love with Lois Lane.
 Don-El - The son of Nim-El (twin brother of Jor-El) and first cousin of Superman and Supergirl. He is the police chief of Kandor (Superman Annual #2).
 El Gar Kur - A Kandorian criminal who posed as Jimmy Olsen.
 Lesla-Lar - A Kandorian scientist and enemy of Supergirl.
 Lili Van-Zee - The daughter of Van-Zee and second cousin of Superman and Supergirl.
 Lyle-Zee - The son of Van-Zee, brother of Lili Van-Zee, and second cousin of Superman and Supergirl.
 Nor-Kann - A scientist and prosecutor who is an old friend of Jor-El. He was responsible for creating Flamebird and Nightwing.
 Shyla Kor-Onn - A Kandorian scientist and former Phantom Zone inmate.
 Sylvia DeWitt - An Earth woman and rich heiress who fell in love with Van-Zee after he was rejected by Lois Lane. The two of them had children named Lili Van-Zee and Lyle-Zee.
 Van-Zee - The twin brother of Dik-Zee and first cousin once removed of Superman and Supergirl who operated as Nightwing. After being unable to win over the affections of Lois Lane, Van-Zee won over the affections of Sylvia DeWitt. The two of them got married and have children named Lili Van-Zee and Lyle-Zee.
 Zora Vi-Lar - A Kandorian who operated as Black Flame and antagonized Supergirl.

New Earth's Kandor inhabitants
 Alura Zor-El - The mother of Kara Zor-El.
 Asha Del-Nar - A Kandorian lieutenant and former writer in the Artist Guild.
 Dal Kir-Ta - An aspirant and member of the Military Guard who was recruited by Fer-Gor.
 Fer-Gor - A Kandorian commander of the Military Guild.
 General Zod - 
 Jax-Ur - 
 Jeq-Vay - An aspirant first class and member of the Red Shard branch of the Military Guild.
 Kal-El - He worked as a commander during his time in Kandor.
 Kara Zor-El - 
 Non - 
 Tyr-Van - A councillor of the Labor Guild.

Prime-Earth's Kandor inhabitants
 Ak Var - 
 Dik-Zee - 
 El Gar Kur - 
 Lesla-Lar - 
 Lili Van-Zee - 
 Lily-Zee - 
 Sylvia DeWitt - 
 Van-Zee -

Other versions
Frank Miller's 2001-2002 miniseries The Dark Knight Strikes Again shows Kandor in the possession of Lex Luthor, who threatens its population to keep Superman loyal to him. The city is freed by Superman's daughter Lara and the Atom, and the inhabitants return to full size. This story was continued in the 2015-2017 sequel, The Dark Knight III: The Master Race with a church of insane Kandoraians led by Baal and his acolyte Quar serving as villains, having gained powers after returning to proper size.

The 2003 Elseworlds miniseries Superman: Red Son shows what would happen if Kal-El's rocket landed in Ukraine, and he grew up as a Soviet citizen. In this story, Brainiac shrinks and bottles Stalingrad instead of Kandor. President Lex Luthor later uses Kandor as physical evidence of Superman's increasing authoritarianism when he asks, "Why don't you just put the whole world in a bottle, Superman?".

Reception
In the 2015 book The Man from Krypton: A Closer Look at Superman, Adam-Troy Castro criticizes "The Pathetic Inferiority Complex of the Kandorians": "As of now, the average size of the remaining members of the species is defined quite well by the people of Kandor, who now face a practical choice between being small and living in a bottle on a shelf, or being small and free to zip around with godlike powers. It seems an obvious choice to me, but the Kandorians remain so self-conscious about being small that they prefer indefinite storage on Superman's shelf. This does not speak well of Kryptonian ambition".

Influence
Artist Mike Kelley created sculptural variations of Kandor, dozens of which were shown at various museums.

In other media

Television
 Kandor appears in The World's Greatest SuperFriends episode "Terror at 20,000 Fathoms". The Kandorians Dorrell (voiced by Shannon Farnon), Erin (voiced by Danny Dark), Kana (voiced by Liberty Williams), and Mivor (voiced by James Reynolds) assist the Super Friends in battling Captain Nimoy in his plot to sink the Earth's continents with nuclear missiles so that he can rule underwater.
 Kandor appears in Smallville. This version was razed during the battle between Krypton and Black Zero, though Jor-El stored and cloned many of its soldiers in The Orb, a backup plan designed by the Science Council in case Krypton was destroyed. It remained sealed until Tess Mercer opened it on Earth, releasing the un-powered clones led by Zod.
 Kandor appears in the Legion of Super Heroes episode "Message in a Bottle". This version contains a device called the Messenger that holds Krypton together, and as a result Brainiac shrinking Kandor destabilized and eventually destroyed Krypton. A thousand years in the future, a time-traveling Superman and the Legion restore Kandor to its original size, and use the Messenger to reform Krypton from its remains. The Kandorians also gain powers after Brainiac 5 turns the city's artificial red sun yellow, allowing them and Superman to defeat Brainiac, Imperiex, and Validus.
 Kandor appears in the Batman: The Brave and the Bold episode "Battle of the Superheroes!". Under the effects of red Kryptonite given to him by Lex Luthor, Superman becomes evil and at one point attacks Kandor, causing an earthquake and terrifying its unseen residents.
 Kandor appears in Justice League Action. It is shown on Brainiac's ship until being claimed by the Justice League in "Plastic Man Saves the World". In the episode "Battle for the Bottled City", Superman explores Kandor as Cyborg and Atom work to keep Brainiac from reclaiming it.
 Kandor appears in Krypton. This version is the hometown of Seg-El, and Brainiac's attempts to shrink and kidnap it are thwarted by a time-traveling Dru-Zod and Val-El from the future. Hailed as a hero, Zod later vowed to weaponize the police force Sagitari to oversee Krypton as a whole under his rule, but was defeated by Seg and Lyta-Zod.

Film
 Kandor makes a cameo appearance in Superman vs. The Elite when The Elite visit the Fortress of Solitude. Manchester Black walks over to the bottled city (were tiny people seem to be flying around) and taps on the glass.
 Kandor appears in All-Star Superman. Akin to the comic, when Superman was dying, he took Kandor to another planet and enlarged it so that the Kandorians can thrive there.
 Kandor appears in Superman: Unbound. Superman visits Alura and Zor-El in Kandor where he learns about Brainiac. Supergirl and her parents narrowly escaped the capture of Kandor. Brainiac uses his technology to keep the captive inhabitants of Kandor (and later Argo City, which he also abducted prior to the destruction of Krypton) from aging. He beams them in just enough food to survive, and uses surveillance technology to ferret out any seditious talk among his prisoners, sending miniaturized robots to punish them. Kandor is enlarged on an uninhabited planet at the end of the film.

Literature
 The first third of the Kevin J. Anderson book The Last Days of Krypton is set in Kandor. The city is portrayed as full of both the most majestic elements of Krypton's culture, and the most venal and short-sighted of the planet's aristocracy. Brainiac shrinks and abducts Kandor and its people, including all eleven members of Krypton's ruling council and Superman's maternal grandparents and uncle. Brainiac tells General Zod that the people of Kandor will not be harmed, and that he views his actions as being necessary to preserve the rich culture of Krypton in the event of a planetary cataclysm (although he is ignorant about any specific cataclysm). Zod lets the rest of the planet think that Brainiac destroyed Kandor and may return as a pretext to increase his own power.

Music
 Kandor appears in Brainiac's Daughter, a song by the XTC spin-off band The Dukes of Stratosphear on their  Psonic Psunspot album.

References

Superman
DC Comics populated places
Kryptonians
Fiction set in the Andromeda Galaxy